Mike Walls (born December 10, 1971), better known as Mr. Mike, is an American rapper best known for his time spent with Suave House Records from the mid to late 90s.

Mr. Mike first started with Suave House as one-half of South Circle with Thorough. The duo released their debut album, Anotha Day Anotha Balla, in the summer of 1995. It became a minor success on the Billboard charts, but the duo disbanded shortly after its release. After South Circle, Mr. Mike embarked on a solo career. His debut album, Wicked Wayz, debuted in the top 40 on the U.S. charts, peaking at 29 on the Billboard 200 in the summer of 1996. Despite the album's success, Mr. Mike left Suave House and joined Priority Records, where he released his second album, 1999's Rhapsody. The album failed to match the success of Wicked Wayz, only making it to 172 on the Billboard 200, and Mike was dropped from Priority. In 2003 he presented and featured on the album Rude and The Gulf Coast Wise Guys - Hard Life, Hard Times. In 2003 Mr. Mike released an independent album entitled Piping Hot, featuring Bun B, MJG, JT Money and Big Gipp but he has been rarely heard from since. He featured on Hilda Lamas song Green Eyes in 2006 and Point Blank's album Ganxstaz Only in 2012.

Discography

Studio albums

Collaboration albums
Anotha Day Anotha Balla with South Circle (1995)

Compilation albums
From da Hood to da Barrio (2003)
Mr. Mike Presents Grind Game (2014)

Mixtapes
• Redemption (2009)

•Mr Mike Presents Through The Storm

References

1972 births
Living people
African-American male rappers
Singers from Texas
Rappers from Houston
Suave House Records artists
Gangsta rappers
G-funk artists
21st-century American rappers
21st-century American male musicians
21st-century African-American musicians
20th-century African-American people